The Marikina River Park is a system of parks, trails, open spaces and recreation facilities along an  stretch of the Marikina River in Marikina, eastern Metro Manila, Philippines. The urban riverside park covers an area of  running through the villages of Santo Niño, Santa Elena, Jesus de la Peña, San Roque, Calumpang, Barangka and Industrial Valley Complex in the western part of the city. The park, under development since 1993, is the city's biggest recreational and sports area containing the Riverbanks Center, a mall and office complex, and the biggest roller skating rink in the Philippines. It is a popular area for camping, jogging, biking and other outdoor activities not just for Marikina residents but also for those from nearby cities in Metro Manila.

History

The park was developed as part of a rehabilitation program called Save the Marikina River Program by the Marikina city government. Launched in 1993, the program aims to reduce flooding and improve the Marikina riverbanks for better water discharge after a 1992 flood left 25% of the city under floodwater. The program involved building access roads to the banks to allow for the cleaning and clearing operations, clearing the banks of informal settlers and other encroachments, demanding the local industries along the riverbanks to set up water treatment facilities in order improve the river's water quality, planting various flora and building cultural, sports and other historical structures to draw residents back to the river.

Events and facilities
The Marikina River Park today is a focal point for community and cultural activities. It hosts the annual Mama Mary Fluvial Parade and Festival and the Marikina Christmas Festival. It has an amphitheater, floating stages for cultural events, a Roman Garden, Chinese Pagoda, a gazebo, riverboats and picnic grounds. Sports facilities include a baseball field, a basketball court and a skating rink. A youth camp and a senior citizens lifestyle center can also be found in the park.

References

Parks in Metro Manila
Buildings and structures in Marikina
Redeveloped ports and waterfronts in the Philippines